The Braille pattern dots-3 is a 6-dot braille cell with the bottom left dot raised, or an 8-dot braille cell with the middle-bottom left dot raised. It is represented by the Unicode code point U+2804, and in Braille ASCII with an apostrophe.

Unified Braille

In unified international braille, the braille pattern dots-3 is used to represent an apostrophe, accent mark, or other punctuation.

Table of unified braille values

Other braille

Plus dots 7 and 8

Related to Braille pattern dots-3 are Braille patterns 37, 38, and 378, which are used in 8-dot braille systems, such as Gardner-Salinas and Luxembourgish Braille.

Related 8-dot kantenji patterns

In the Japanese kantenji braille, the standard 8-dot Braille patterns 7, 17, 47, and 147 are the patterns related to Braille pattern dots-3, since the two additional dots of kantenji patterns 03, 37, and 037 are placed above the base 6-dot cell, instead of below, as in standard 8-dot braille.

Kantenji using braille patterns 7, 17, 47, or 147

This listing includes kantenji using Braille pattern dots-3 for all 6349 kanji found in JIS C 6226-1978.

  - N/A - used only as a selector

Selector

  -  へ/⺩ + selector 3  =  主
  -  宿 + selector 3  =  冖
  -  氷/氵 + selector 3  =  冫
  -  も/門 + selector 3  =  区
  -  み/耳 + も/門 + selector 3  =  躯
  -  も/門 + selector 3 + selector 3  =  匚
  -  も/門 + も/門 + selector 3  =  區
  -  仁/亻 + も/門 + selector 3  =  傴
  -  け/犬 + も/門 + selector 3  =  奩
  -  ふ/女 + も/門 + selector 3  =  嫗
  -  や/疒 + も/門 + selector 3  =  嶇
  -  ひ/辶 + selector 3  =  咸
  -  れ/口 + ひ/辶 + selector 3  =  喊
  -  ち/竹 + ひ/辶 + selector 3  =  箴
  -  い/糹/#2 + ひ/辶 + selector 3  =  緘
  -  か/金 + ひ/辶 + selector 3  =  鍼
  -  せ/食 + ひ/辶 + selector 3  =  鰔
  -  ん/止 + ひ/辶 + selector 3  =  鹹
  -  し/巿 + selector 3  =  巾
  -  し/巿 + selector 3 + selector 3  =  黹
  -  ゐ + selector 3  =  幺
  -  よ + selector 3  =  广
  -  ゆ + selector 3  =  彳
  -  龸 + selector 3  =  文
  -  れ/口 + 龸 + selector 3  =  吝
  -  こ/子 + 龸 + selector 3  =  斈
  -  日 + 龸 + selector 3  =  旻
  -  い/糹/#2 + 龸 + selector 3  =  紊
  -  す/発 + 龸 + selector 3  =  虔
  -  も/門 + 龸 + selector 3  =  閔
  -  そ/馬 + 龸 + selector 3  =  馼
  -  に/氵 + selector 3  =  泡
  -  く/艹 + に/氵 + selector 3  =  萢
  -  囗 + selector 3  =  用
  -  む/車 + 囗 + selector 3  =  蛹
  -  の + selector 3  =  禾
  -  心 + selector 3  =  粟
  -  こ/子 + selector 3  =  耒
  -  す/発 + selector 3  =  虎
  -  す/発 + selector 3 + selector 3  =  虍
  -  う/宀/#3 + す/発 + selector 3  =  彪
  -  へ/⺩ + す/発 + selector 3  =  琥
  -  ね/示 + す/発 + selector 3  =  褫
  -  せ/食 + す/発 + selector 3  =  鯱
  -  そ/馬 + selector 3  =  豚
  -  ひ/辶 + そ/馬 + selector 3  =  遯
  -  れ/口 + そ/馬 + selector 3  =  啄
  -  へ/⺩ + そ/馬 + selector 3  =  琢
  -  は/辶 + selector 3  =  遊
  -  に/氵 + は/辶 + selector 3  =  游
  -  む/車 + は/辶 + selector 3  =  蝣
  -  せ/食 + selector 3  =  酉
  -  ひ/辶 + せ/食 + selector 3  =  逎
  -  selector 3 + め/目  =  乂
  -  め/目 + selector 3 + selector 3  =  睿
  -  selector 3 + え/訁  =  云
  -  selector 3 + む/車  =  冓
  -  ひ/辶 + selector 3 + む/車  =  遘
  -  selector 3 + う/宀/#3  =  冢
  -  selector 3 + か/金  =  咼
  -  selector 3 + け/犬  =  夫
  -  た/⽥ + selector 3 + け/犬  =  畉
  -  心 + selector 3 + け/犬  =  芙
  -  み/耳 + selector 3 + け/犬  =  趺
  -  む/車 + selector 3 + け/犬  =  輦
  -  す/発 + selector 3 + け/犬  =  麸
  -  selector 3 + に/氵  =  奚
  -  selector 3 + 仁/亻  =  尢
  -  selector 3 + き/木  =  已
  -  selector 3 + こ/子  =  巽
  -  selector 3 + ね/示  =  幵
  -  き/木 + selector 3 + ね/示  =  枅
  -  selector 3 + と/戸  =  并
  -  selector 3 + 囗  =  弋
  -  selector 3 + ひ/辶  =  戌
  -  selector 3 + ほ/方  =  敖
  -  火 + selector 3 + ほ/方  =  熬
  -  む/車 + selector 3 + ほ/方  =  螯
  -  ひ/辶 + selector 3 + ほ/方  =  遨
  -  せ/食 + selector 3 + ほ/方  =  鰲
  -  selector 3 + ふ/女  =  聿
  -  や/疒 + selector 3 + ふ/女  =  肄
  -  selector 3 + ゆ/彳  =  臾
  -  ⺼ + selector 3 + ゆ/彳  =  腴
  -  selector 3 + や/疒  =  艮
  -  け/犬 + selector 3 + や/疒  =  狠
  -  み/耳 + selector 3 + や/疒  =  跟
  -  selector 3 + そ/馬  =  曾
  -  selector 3 + く/艹  =  艸
  -  selector 3 + み/耳  =  襄
  -  る/忄 + selector 3 + そ/馬  =  忸
  -  氷/氵 + selector 3 + は/辶  =  敝
  -  日 + selector 3 + は/辶  =  暼
  -  も/門 + 宿 + selector 3  =  匸

Notes

Braille patterns